Bradunia is a genus of moths of the family Noctuidae.

Species
Bradunia basistriga  Hampson, 1926
Bradunia costigutta  (Schaus, 1916)
Bradunia guanabana  (Schaus, 1916)
Bradunia improba  (Schaus, 1916)
Bradunia macella  Dognin, 1914

References
Natural History Museum Lepidoptera genus database

Calpinae